For its 2003–04 season, Carlisle United F.C. competed in the English Football League Division Three. Carlisle United achieved a record of 12-9-15, the second-worst record in the third division. The club's 23rd place finish in the division led to them being relegated to the Football Conference National for the 2004–05 season.

The team started the season being managed by Roddy Collins, but Collins was sacked after a four-game run of losses at the start of the season. player-manager Paul Simpson took over for the rest of the campaign,.

Results & fixtures

English Third Division

English League Cup

FA Cup

Football League Trophy

References
 11v11

Carlisle United F.C. seasons